Collilongus (meaning "long neck") is an extinct genus of small archosauriform, possibly a rauisuchian, known from Early Triassic (Olenekian age) rocks of Czatkowice 1, Poland. It was first named by Magdalena Borsuk−Białynicka; and Andriej G. Sennikov in 2009.  The type and only known species is Collilongus rarus.  It is a rare component of the Czatkowice 1 fauna, known only from vertebrae.  Collilongus was a contemporary of the more common archosauriform Osmolskina.

References

Early Triassic reptiles of Europe
Prehistoric archosauriforms
Fossil taxa described in 2009
Fossils of Poland
Prehistoric reptile genera